Kinderhook Creek is a  tributary to Stockport Creek, an inlet of the Hudson River in the United States. From its source in Hancock, Massachusetts, the creek runs southwest through the Taconic Mountains into Rensselaer County, New York, and then into Columbia County. It flows through the towns of Stephentown, New Lebanon, Nassau, Chatham, Kinderhook and Stuyvesant to its mouth at Stockport Creek in the town of Stockport.

History
Kinderhook Creek was known as Pasanthkack by the Mahican Native Americans.  Prior to 1667 it was known as "Major Abram's (Staats) Kill" and "Third Falls." In 1823 it was called Stuyvesant Falls (now referring to a village on the creek) and after 1845 "Kinderhook Creek".

The name "Kinderhook" has its root in the landing of Henry Hudson in the area around present-day Stuyvesant, where he was greeted by Native Americans with many children. With the Dutch Kinder meaning "child" and Hoeck meaning "bend" or "hook" [in the river], the name literally means "bend in the river where the children are". A figurative translation is "children's point".

The area around Kinderhook Creek was called Machackoesk by the Native American Mahican Tribe.

Tributaries
 Valatie Kill - Native American, Tsat-sa-was-sa or Tack-a-was-ick creek (and lake) are placed in the town of Nassau by the French. The name may refer to a stone mortar.
 Kline Kill - Native American Mahican name Scom-pa-muck or Squampanoc
 Indian Creek
 Punsit Creek
 Stony Kill
 Frisbee Creek
 Queechy Lake Brook - Mahican name Quis-sich-kook, unknown meaning
 Green Brook
 Tackawasick Creek
 Cranberry Vly
 Black Brook
 Huff Brook
 Hollow Brook
 Wyomanock Creek - Native American name for the creek. Also known as Lebanon Creek.
 South Branch Wyomanock Creek
 Berry Pond Creek
 Red Oak Brook
 Taplin Bourn (from Middle English bourne, a brook)
 Black River
 Roaring Brook
 East Brook
 West Brook
 Bentley Brook
 Whitman Brook
 Jones Brook
 Rathburn Brook

See also
List of rivers of New York
List of rivers of Massachusetts
Kinderhook (town), New York

References

Rivers of Columbia County, New York
Rivers of Berkshire County, Massachusetts
Rivers of New York (state)
Taconic Mountains
Tributaries of the Hudson River
Rivers of Massachusetts